Held Hostage is a Lifetime Movie starring Julie Benz that aired on July 19, 2009. It is based on the true story of Michelle Renee Ramskill-Estey who also wrote the novel. Hal Foxton Beckett was nominated for a Leo Award for the music featured in the movie.

Plot
Michelle Ramskill-Estey (Julie Benz), a single mother, is kidnapped by three masked men and held hostage until she is forced to rob a bank which is the only option she has to save her only child's life while they are both wired to explode.

Actual events
In November 2000, Michelle Ramskill-Estey and her 7-year-old daughter Breea Ramskill returned to their Needles, California home, only to find 4 men, armed with guns. They strapped fake bombs to the two and ordered Ramskill-Estey to drive to a Bank of America location, where she worked, and give them the $360,000 in the vault.  Three people were charged, two men and one woman. The two men were convicted and the woman was acquitted of all charges. The story was shown on I Survived... and 48 Hours.

Cast
Julie Benz as Michelle Ramskill-Estey
Brendan Penny as Chris Clark/Money One
Sonja Bennett as Sandi Clark
Natasha Calis as Breea Ramskill

Other media
The case was reconstructed for an episode of the Japanese television show World Extreme Mystery, which aired in 2019.

References

External links

2009 television films
2009 films
2009 crime drama films
American crime drama films
Crime films based on actual events
Drama films based on actual events
Films based on American novels
Lifetime (TV network) films
American drama television films
2000s English-language films
2000s American films